Snøtoppen (The Snow Top) is a mountain in Gustav V Land at Nordaustlandet Island, in Svalbard, Norway. With an elevation of  it is the highest mountain of the island of Nordaustlandet, it is located on Laponiahalvøya Peninsula.

References

Mountains of Nordaustlandet